Fisher is a town in Polk County, Minnesota, United States. It is part of the Grand Forks-ND-MN Metropolitan Statistical Area. The population was 422 at the 2020 census.  Fisher has become a bedroom community for the nearby Greater Grand Forks Metropolitan Area.

History
Fisher is one of the oldest settlements in Polk County.  It was originally named "Shirt-Tail Bend" because a shirt had once been tied to a stick to warn steamboats of a bend in the river.  It was renamed 'Fisher's Landing', and later shortened to Fisher.  These names were adopted in honor of William H. Fisher, who was born in Hunterdon county, N. J., December 24, 1844; engaged in railroad business after 1864; settled in St. Paul in 1873, as attorney for the receiver of the St. Paul and Pacific railroad, and as its assistant manager and superintendent ; later was president and manager of the St. Paul and Duluth railroad company, 1883-99; was vice president and general manager of the Duluth and Winnipeg railroad company, 1888-93.

Geography

Demographics

2010 census
As of the census of 2010, there were 435 people, 180 households, and 114 families living in the city. The racial makeup of the city was 97.9% White, 0.2% African American, 0.9% Native American, 0.7% from other races, and 0.2% from two or more races. Hispanic or Latino of any race were 4.6% of the population.

There were 180 households, of which 35.6% had children under the age of 18 living with them, 50.6% were married couples living together, 8.3% had a female householder with no husband present, 4.4% had a male householder with no wife present, and 36.7% were non-families. 29.4% of all households were made up of individuals, and 13.9% had someone living alone who was 65 years of age or older. The average household size was 2.42 and the average family size was 3.07.

The median age in the city was 32.2 years. 25.7% of residents were under the age of 18; 11.5% were between the ages of 18 and 24; 28.5% were from 25 to 44; 19.5% were from 45 to 64; and 14.7% were 65 years of age or older. The gender makeup of the city was 50.3% male and 49.7% female.

2000 census
As of the census of 2000, there were 435 people, 177 households, and 120 families living in the city. The racial makeup of the city was 98.62% White, 1.15% from other races, and 0.23% from two or more races. Hispanic or Latino of any race were 2.30% of the population.

There were 177 households, out of which 28.8% had children under the age of 18 living with them, 52.0% were married couples living together, 12.4% had a female householder with no husband present, and 32.2% were non-families. 26.6% of all households were made up of individuals, and 14.7% had someone living alone who was 65 years of age or older.  The average household size was 2.46 and the average family size was 2.93.

In the city, the population was spread out, with 26.0% under the age of 18, 7.8% from 18 to 24, 29.0% from 25 to 44, 22.3% from 45 to 64, and 14.9% who were 65 years of age or older.  The median age was 37 years. For every 100 females, there were 99.5 males.  For every 100 females age 18 and over, there were 98.8 males.

The median income for a household in the city was $38,750, and the median income for a family was $49,444. Males had a median income of $32,656 versus $20,208 for females. The per capita income for the city was $19,083.  About 5.5% of families and 6.8% of the population were below the poverty line, including 13.5% of those under age 18 and 3.3% of those age 65 or over.

References

Cities in Minnesota
Cities in Polk County, Minnesota